The top level of competition in the Welsh rugby union system is the United Rugby Championship (formerly the Celtic League, PRO12 and PRO14) which is a league of professional teams from Ireland, Scotland, Wales, Italy and South Africa.  Wales currently has four entries in the URC: Cardiff Rugby, Dragons, Ospreys and Scarlets.

United Rugby Championship
This is a closed league with no promotion or relegation; teams are effectively franchises. The teams also compete in the European Rugby Champions Cup (known as the Heineken Champions Cup for sponsorship reasons) and the European Rugby Challenge Cup.

2021-22 league system

2013-14 league system

See also
 Rugby union in Wales

Sports league systems